Robert Bruce (born 11 March 1969) is an Australian former swimmer who competed in the 1988 Summer Olympics in Seoul, South Korea.  As a 19-year-old, Bruce finished sixth in the final of the 200-metre individual medley, and third in the B final of the 400-metre individual medley.

See also
 List of Commonwealth Games medallists in swimming (men)

References

1969 births
Living people
Australian male medley swimmers
Olympic swimmers of Australia
Swimmers at the 1988 Summer Olympics
Commonwealth Games medallists in swimming
Commonwealth Games gold medallists for Australia
Commonwealth Games silver medallists for Australia
Swimmers at the 1990 Commonwealth Games
20th-century Australian people
21st-century Australian people
Medallists at the 1990 Commonwealth Games